Christopher Warren-Green (born 30 July 1955) is a British violinist and conductor.  He was born in Gloucestershire and attended Westminster City School, where he was a chorister, and later the Royal Academy of Music.

Warren-Green has served as concertmaster of the Philharmonia Orchestra. Warren-Green has held the position of Music Director of the London Chamber Orchestra (LCO) since 1988.  In 2005, Vladimir Ashkenazy invited Warren-Green and the LCO to Hong Kong as the resident orchestra for the Hong Kong International Piano Competition.

On the personal invitation of the Prince of Wales, Warren-Green was invited to arrange the music and conduct the Philharmonia Orchestra for the Service of Dedication and Prayer celebrating the marriage of the Prince of Wales and the Duchess of Cornwall. To mark the occasion of the Queen's 80th birthday at Kew Palace, he conducted a private concert for the entire Royal family.

In 1998, Warren-Green became Principal Guest Conductor of the Nordic Chamber Orchestra, taking over as Chief Conductor from 2001 until 2005.  From 1998 to 2001, he was Chief Conductor of the Joenkoeping Sinfonietta.  He was appointed Principal Conductor of the Camerata Resident Orchestra of the Megaron Athens in October 2004.  In May 2009, the Charlotte Symphony Orchestra named Warren-Green its 11th music director, effective with the 2010–2011 season. In August 2012, the orchestra announced the extension of Warren-Green's contract through the 2015–2016 season.

Warren-Green has recorded for BMG, EMI, Philips, Virgin, Warner Classics., Chandos and Deutsche Grammophon.  In July 2007, he conducted the premiere of Nigel Hess's Concerto for Piano and Orchestra, commissioned by the Prince of Wales in memory of his grandmother, with soloist Lang Lang. He conducted the London Chamber Orchestra at the April 2011 wedding of the Duke and Duchess of Cambridge before a worldwide television audience.

In May 2018, he conducted the orchestra at the royal wedding of Prince Harry and Meghan Markle. The group consisted of musicians from the BBC National Orchestra of Wales and English Chamber Orchestra and featured virtuoso cellist Sheku Kanneh-Mason.

In August 2008 Warren-Green appeared in the reality TV talent show-themed television series, Maestro on BBC Two, as a mentor to Jane Asher, one of the students.

Warren-Green is married to Rosemary Furniss, a violinist, and artistic director and concertmaster of the LCO.  They have three children and three stepchildren.

References

External links
 HarrisonParrott agency biography of Warren-Green
 LCO biography of Warren-Green

See also
Royal Academy of Music

English conductors (music)
British male conductors (music)
Living people
1955 births
Alumni of the Royal Academy of Music
21st-century British conductors (music)
21st-century British male musicians